The men's 200-metre butterfly event at the 2001 World Aquatics Championships took place between 23 July – 24 July. Both the heats and semifinals were held on 23 July with the heats being held in the morning session and the semifinals being held in the evening session. The final was held on 24 July.

In the final, American swimmer Michael Phelps broke his own world record with a time of 1:54.58, bettering his previous record of 1:54.92. For Phelps, this was also his first world title since finishing 5th in the same event at the 2000 Summer Olympics.

Results

Heats

Semifinals

Final

Key: WR = World record

References

External links
7/22/2001 Results from About.com Retrieved 2010-01-19
Results from swimrankings.net Retrieved 2010-01-21

Swimming at the 2001 World Aquatics Championships